The Alaska Basin Trail is a  long hiking trail in Grand Teton National Park and Bridger-Teton National Forest in the U.S. state of Wyoming. The trail begins at a junction on the Death Canyon Trail near the Death Canyon Barn and climbs steeply to Static Peak Divide. From the divide, the trail soon splits with a western branch descending into Alaska Basin and the eastern trail (also known as the Alaska Basin Shelf Trail) continuing north to junction with the Teton Crest Trail. The Alaska Basin Trail is oftentimes used by climbers attempting to make ascents of Buck Mountain and Veiled Peak.

See also
List of hiking trails in Grand Teton National Park

References

Hiking trails of Grand Teton National Park